Monika Felizeter (born 7 November 1977) is an Austrian rower. She competed in the women's lightweight double sculls event at the 1996 Summer Olympics.

References

1977 births
Living people
Austrian female rowers
Olympic rowers of Austria
Rowers at the 1996 Summer Olympics
People from Bregenz
Sportspeople from Vorarlberg